The 1884 Louisiana gubernatorial election was the second election to take place under the Louisiana Constitution of 1879. As a result of this election Samuel D. McEnery was re-elected Governor of Louisiana. The election saw widespread intimidation of African-Americans which guaranteed the election of the Democratic nominee.

Results
Popular Vote

References

1884
Gubernatorial
Louisiana
April 1884 events